Patrik Ipavec (born 13 July 1977) is a Slovenian footballer.

He has been capped for the Slovenian national team.

References

External links

1977 births
Living people
Slovenian footballers
Association football forwards
Slovenian PrvaLiga players
Cypriot First Division players
FC Koper players
NK Primorje players
NK Olimpija Ljubljana (1945–2005) players
ND Gorica players
NK Mura players
NK Ivančna Gorica players
Slovenian expatriate footballers
Slovenian expatriate sportspeople in Cyprus
Expatriate footballers in Cyprus
Enosis Neon Paralimni FC players
Ethnikos Achna FC players
Slovenia international footballers
People from Piran